Madeline Weinstein is an American actress best known for starring in the Netflix comedy-drama Alex Strangelove and the independent film Beach Rats.

Filmography

Film

Television

Theatre

Personal life
Weinstein currently resides in Brooklyn, New York.

References

External links

Living people
21st-century American actresses
Actresses from New York City
American television actresses
American film actresses
American stage actresses
American feminists
Northwestern University alumni
Year of birth missing (living people)